(Spanish for Angels from Hell or Hell Angels) is a heavy metal band from Basque Country, Spain, formed in 1980. Signing with Warner Bros. Records in 1984, they achieved success in their home country and Latin America during the 1980s and the early 1990s. In 2003, the band reformed and signed back onto Warner Bros. Records, releasing Todos Somos Angeles later that year.

Angeles Del Infierno was formed by Robert Alvarez and Santi Rubio in 1978 in San Sebastian with:
 Juan Gallardo: vocals
 Robert Alvarez: lead guitar
 Manu Garcia: rhythm guitar
 Santi Rubio: bass
 Inaki Munita: drums

Ángeles del Infierno released their first album,  (Pact with the Devil), in 1984. They immediately had success in terms of both, record sales and critical reception. They scored several hits with songs like their anthem "Maldito sea tu nombre".

Band members 
 Juan Gallardo: voice
 Robert Alvarez: guitar
 Foley: guitar
 Emilio Villareal: bass
 Eddie: Keyboard
 Gerardo Garcia: Drums

Discography 
 Pacto con el Diablo (1984)
 Diabolicca (1985)
 Instinto Animal (1986)
 Joven Para Morir (1986)
 Lo Mejor de Ángeles del Infierno (1987)
 666 (1988)
 A Cara o Cruz (1993)
 Lo Mejor de Ángeles del Infierno: 1984-1993 (1997)
 Éxitos Diabólicos (2001)
 Discografía 1984-93 (2002)
 Todos somos Ángeles (2003)

External links 
 

Basque music bands
Spanish heavy metal musical groups
Musical groups established in 1980